The Thunderbolt is a 1912 American silent, black-and-white short drama starring William Garwood, James Cruze, David Thompson, Jean Darnell, and Mignon Anderson.

Cast
 James Cruze as the dishonest broker
 Mignon Anderson as the broker's daughter, as an adult
 David Thompson as the poor man
 Jean Darnell the poor man's wife
 William Garwood as the poor couple's son, as an adult

References

1912 films
1912 drama films
Thanhouser Company films
Silent American drama films
American silent short films
American black-and-white films
1912 short films
1910s American films